California's 47th congressional district is a congressional district in the U.S. state of California.

Following 2020 redistricting, the district shifted to Orange County to contain Irvine, Huntington Beach, Costa Mesa, Newport Beach and Seal Beach. It is currently represented by Democrat Katie Porter.

Competitiveness
The district, a Democratic-leaning swing district with a Cook Partisan Voting Index of D+3, includes the heavily Democratic city of Irvine, and Republican-leaning coastal cities such as Huntington Beach and Newport Beach.

In statewide races

Notes

Composition

As of the 2020 redistricting, California's 38th congressional district is located in Southern California. It covers the South Coast Metro area of Orange County.

Orange County is split between this district, the 45th district, the 46th district, the 40th district, and the 49th district. The 47th, 45th and 46th are partitioned by Highway 405, Old Ranch Parkway, Seal Beach Blvd, St Cloud Dr, Montecito Rd, Rossmoor Center Way, 12240 Seal Beach Blvd-Los Alamitos Army Airfield, Bolsa Chica Channel, Rancho Rd, Harold Pl, Springdale St, 6021 Anacapa Dr-Willow Ln, Edward St, Bolsa Ave, Goldenwest St, McFadden Ave, Union Pacific Railroad, 15241 Cascade Ln-15241 Cedarwood Ave, Highway 39, Edinger Ave, Newland St, Heil Ave, Magnolia St, Warner Ave, Garfield Ave, the Santa Ana River, MacArthur Blvd, Harbor Blvd, Sunflower Ave, Costa Mesa Freeway, E Alton Parkway, and Red Hill Ave.

The 47th, 40th and 49th are partitioned by Barranca Parkway, Jamboree Rd, Warner Ave, Harvard Ave, Myford Rd, Highway 5, Loma Ridge Nature Preserve, Bee Canyon Access Rd, Portola Parkway, Highway 133, Highway 241, Bake Parkway, San Diego Freeway, Ridge Route Dr, Moulton Parkway, Santa Maria Ave, Via Vista, Alta Vis, Santa Vittoria Dr, Avenida del Sol, Punta Alta, Galle Azul, Bahia Blanca W, Laguna Coast Wilderness Park, Highway S18, Aliso & Wood Canyons, Vista del Sol, Highway 1, Stonington Rd, Virginia Way, 7th Ave, and Laguna Beach.

The 47th district takes in the cities of Costa Mesa, Irvine, Seal Beach, Huntington Beach, Newport Beach, and Laguna Beach.

Cities & CDP with 10,000 or more
 Irvine - 307,670
 Huntington Beach - 198,711
 Costa Mesa - 111,918
 Newport Beach - 85,239
 Seal Beach - 25,242
 Laguna Beach - 23,032

List of members representing the district

Election results

1992

1994

1996

1998

2000

2002

2004

2006

2008

2010

2012

2014

2016

2018

2020

2022

Historical district boundaries
From 2003 through 2013, the district included many of Orange County's central suburbs, including Anaheim, Garden Grove and Santa Ana. Due to redistricting after the 2010 United States Census, the district has moved west to parts of Los Angeles County and now includes Catalina and San Clemente islands. The district also retains parts of Orange County such as Garden Grove.

In popular culture
California's 47th congressional district was the scene of a congressional election (won by a deceased Democrat), and later a congressional special election (won by the Republican incumbent), featured in several episodes of the political drama The West Wing.

See also
List of United States congressional districts

References

External links
GovTrack.us: California's 47th congressional district
RAND California Election Returns: District Definitions
California Voter Foundation map - CD47

47
Government of Los Angeles County, California
Government in Orange County, California
Government in Long Beach, California
Channel Islands of California
Cypress, California
Rossmoor, California
Garden Grove, California
Lakewood, California
Los Angeles Harbor Region
Signal Hill, California
Westminster, California
Constituencies established in 1993
1993 establishments in California